Chongxian Township is a township in Xingguo County, Jiangxi, China. , it administers the following twelve villages:
Chongxian Village
Chongyi Village
Dongfeng Village
Longtan She Ethnic Village
Shangmian Village
Xiaguang Village
Taiping Village
Sanjiao Village
Hetang Village
Dalong Village
Beisheng Village
Qifen Village

References 

Township-level divisions of Jiangxi
Xingguo County